The Hawaii State Intermediate Court of Appeals (ICA) is the intermediate appellate court of the Hawaii State Judiciary. It has jurisdiction over appeals from lower courts and agencies. 

The ICA is composed of one chief judge and five associate judges, who sit in randomly selected panels of three. Each judge is appointed to an initial ten-year term by the Governor. Judges are nominated by the Governor from a list of four to six names submitted by the Judicial Selection Commission. A judge's nomination is subject to confirmation by the Hawaii Senate, but reappointments require only approval of the Judicial Selection Commission. Under article VI, §3 of the Hawaii Constitution, all judges of the Intermediate Court of Appeals, like the justices of the Supreme Court of Hawaii and the judges of the Hawaii State Circuit Courts, have a mandatory retirement age of 70.

History
The Intermediate Court of Appeals was established in 1979. The court consisted of one chief judge and two associate judges.  Annual salary of the chief judge was set at $45,000 and the associates judges were set at $43,750.  The court shared concurrent jurisdiction with the Hawaii Supreme Court.

Following judgment or appropriate agency decision, a party filed an application for writ of certiorari with the Hawaii Supreme Court. Following granting of a writ of certiorari, the Hawaii Supreme Court would then assign the case to the Intermediate Court of Appeals or itself. The Hawaii Supreme Court could also reassign a case to itself under limited circumstances.

In 1992, the court expanded to one chief judge and three associate judges.

In 2001, the court expanded to one chief judge and five associate judges.

In 2004, all appeals from the lower courts and agency decisions were changed to be made directly to the Intermediate Court of Appeals.   However, a party could still submit an application to transfer a case to the Hawaii Supreme Court upon the grounds of a question of imperative or fundamental public importance; an appeal from a decision of any court or agency when appeals are allowed by law invalidating an amendment to the state constitution or determining a state statute, county ordinance, or agency rule to be invalid on the grounds that it was invalidly enacted or is unconstitutional, on its face or as applied, under either the constitution of the State or the United States; or a sentence of life imprisonment without the possibility of parole.

For the 2016-2017 state fiscal year, the budget for the Hawaii Supreme Court and the Intermediate Court of Appeals was approximately $6.7 million.

Salaries
The Commission on Salaries has recommend the following salaries for the chief judge and the associate judges:

Current judges
 the judges and their current terms were:
 Chief Judge Lisa M. Ginoza (April 24, 2018 – April 23, 2028)
 Associate Judge Katherine G. Leonard (January 30, 2018 – January 29, 2028)
 Associate Judge Derrick H.M. Chan (April 13, 2017 – April 12, 2027)
 Associate Judge Keith K. Hiraoka (November 19, 2018 – November 18, 2028)
 Associate Judge Clyde J. Wadsworth (October 21, 2019 – October 20, 2029)
Associate Judge Sonja McCullen (October 1, 2021 – September 30, 2031)

See also
 Courts of Hawaii

References

External links
 The Intermediate Court of Appeals
 Hawaii Rules of Appellate Procedure
 Hawaii Appellate Court Opinions and Orders

Hawaii state courts
State appellate courts of the United States
1979 establishments in Hawaii
Courts and tribunals established in 1979